Tres Rios may refer to:

 Três Rios, Rio de Janeiro, Brazil
 Tres Ríos, Cartago, Costa Rica
 Desarrollo Urbano Tres Ríos (Tres Ríos), Culiacán, Sinaloa, Mexico

See also
Trois-Rivières (disambiguation)
Three Rivers (disambiguation)